Fábio Pereira de Azevedo (1 January 1977 – 2 February 2018), known as Fabinho Baiano or simply Fabinho, was a footballer who played as a striker. Born and raised in Brazil, he was naturalized by Togo and played for that national team.

During his four years in the top flight Primera División de El Salvador side Isidro Metapán, Fabinho made the title goal for at Clausura 2007 during extra time against Luis Ángel Firpo.

Fabinho died in the early hours of 2 February 2018 in a car crash on the BR-282 highway.

Biography 
Fabinho was born in Salvador, a city on the northeast coast of Brazil and the capital of the Northeastern Brazilian state of Bahia.

International career 
Fabinho played for Togo on 5 July 2003 in a 2004 African Cup of Nations Qualifying match against Mauritania. He was also Togolese international in two friendly matches, one against the Ghanaian club Asante Kotoko in a friendly match on 29 June 2003 in Stade de Kégué, Lomé.

References

External links

1977 births
2018 deaths
Association football forwards
Brazilian footballers
Sportspeople from Salvador, Bahia
Associação Chapecoense de Futebol players
Salvadoran Primera División players
C.D. Águila footballers
San Salvador F.C. footballers
A.D. Isidro Metapán footballers
Brazilian expatriate footballers
Brazilian expatriate sportspeople in El Salvador
Expatriate footballers in El Salvador
Road incident deaths in Brazil
Naturalized citizens of Togo
Togo international footballers
Togolese footballers
21st-century Togolese people